There are several conventions for phonetic transcription using the Cyrillic script, typically augmented with Latin and Greek to fill in missing sounds. The details vary by author, and depend on which letters are available for the language of the text. This article follows common Russian usage. 

Latin w, l, k and h are commonly used for IPA , though q is also used with its IPA value instead of k. Greek φ and γ are commonly used for IPA .

Symbols
Parentheses mark alternative symbols.

 here is a hack: the top line should connect the two parts of the letter together.

Common diacritics
[сꚝ] or [сʼ] palatalized
[с·] not palatalized
[с°] labialized
[с̣] retroflex
[т̪] laminal
[т̯] apical (same as non-syllabic)
[т̇] alveolarized?
[и̇] pharyngealized

[а́] stress
[с꞉] or [с̄] long
[ӑ] short
[д͡ж] or [о͡у] affricate or diphthong
[т͕] unreleased plosive ('implosive')
[л̭] voiceless
[w̬] voiced
[и̃] nasalized
[л̥] syllabic 
[и̯] non-syllabic (same as apical)

[о̜] or [о̨] open
[о̹] (or reversed ogonek) close
[о꭪] fronted (diacritic often placed over the letter)
[э꭫] backed (diacritic often placed over the letter)
[ӓ] advanced/fronted and raised
[а·] fronted off-glide
[·а] fronted on-glide or following a non-palatalized consonant
[аᵊ] diphthongal off-glide or centralized

References

Phonetic alphabets
Cyrillic script